Theodor Mantler (1893 – 27 January 1970) was an Austrian football goalkeeper and referee.

Club career
He played with SK Rapid Wien in the season 1916–17 when they won the championship, and then he started the season 1917–18 and after making one league appearance he moved to Germania Schwechat on September 3, 1917. After the end of First World War, Mantler played for some time in Yugoslavia with UTK Novi Sad in the Novi Sad Football Subassociation. Later, he returned to Austria and became a referee.

Honours
Rapid Wien
Austrian Championship: 1916–17

References

1893 births
1970 deaths
Footballers from Vienna
Austrian footballers
Austrian expatriate footballers
Association football goalkeepers
SK Rapid Wien players
Expatriate footballers in Germany
Expatriate footballers in Yugoslavia
Austrian expatriate sportspeople in Yugoslavia
Date of birth missing
Place of death missing
Austrian football referees